Cottonization is a process that adapts flax and hemp fibres for spinning with other staple fibres such as cotton or wool.  Cottonization removes impurities (non-fibrous materials such as linen or pectin) and shortens the fiber length of flax for subsequent spinning processes. Cottonized fibers are helpful in blending with other staple fibers such as cotton or wool.

Process 
Cottonization can convert flax to short single fibres. These short fibres can be spun similarly to cotton. It includes the process of removing the lignin that holds the hemp fibres together. Lignin gives stalks their rigidity, It acts as a glue that holds the plant cell wall together.

Methods 
Methods of obtaining cottonized fibers are as below:

 Mechanical
 Chemical
 Enzymatic

See also 

 Retting
 Plasma treatment (textiles)

References

Textile techniques
Properties of textiles